The Men's team pursuit at the 2006 Commonwealth Games took place on March 18, 2006 at the Vodafone Arena in Melbourne, Australia.

Qualification

Finals
Bronze medal race

Gold medal race

External links
 Qualification
 Finals

Track cycling at the 2006 Commonwealth Games
Cycling at the Commonwealth Games – Men's team pursuit